The Yamaha V50 is a hybrid music workstation introduced in 1989. It combines a sequencer, rhythm machine, an FM synthesis-based sound module and a MIDI keyboard.

Features

The sequencer
The internal sequencer has 8 tracks, with an approximate capability of 16000 notes shared between maximum of 8 songs at a time.

Rhythm machine
The rhythm machine has 61 PCM samples, with polyphony of 8 samples. The rhythm machine contains 100 preset short rhythm patterns and allows the user to create 100 additional patterns, known as "internal patterns". The patterns can be assembled into larger rhythm songs.
The beauty of the rhythm machine is that you can adjust it "on the fly" (e.g. stop/start, tempo, volume, pattern select,...) whilst continuing to play a synthe sound patch or performance. You can also let the Rhythm play while you change/edit the synthe's Voice/Performance patch - excellent features for uninterrupted experimentation and live performance.

The sound module
The FM synthesis provided by the sound module is based on 4 analog DCO oscillators that could be chained by selecting one of the 8 available routings. Each oscillator can generate one of the 8 available waveforms. Additionally, in each of the algorithms, oscillator 4 can be set to modulate itself with a configurable amount of feedback. The sound unit is basically a slightly upgraded variant of the Yamaha TX81Z module, with increased polyphony and other minor tweaks.

The synthesis unit has a 16-note polyphony and 8-instrument multitimbral capability.  The unit contains 100 preset instruments stored on ROM and an additional 100 user-configurable sounds. Multiple sounds can be layered into so-called performances to provide more interesting sounds than one instrument could provide alone. One common way to use this feature is to include several instances of the same instrument in the same performance while detuning each of them slightly to create a "thicker" or more lively sound. e.g. you can layer or split (i.e. zone) the keyboard with up to 8 different (or same) "Single" voice patches to create a "Performance" patch which can result in very lush, complex and unique tones from just this one instrument.

There are 11 "tunings" available including the standard "Equal Temperament" - useful if you wish to experiment, or to produce a performance of classical music in the tuning of its day. e.g. Pythagorean, Werckmeister, 1/4 tone, etc. Microtuning is also available allowing you to specify the pitch of each note to create unique tunings.

The keyboard
The V50 keyboard consists of 61 keys, covering 5 octaves. It supports both velocity sensitivity and channel aftertouch. The MIDI transmit channel of the keyboard is configurable. Wheels for pitch bend and modulation control are provided on the left side of the keys.

Other features
The V50 has both a double density 3.5" floppy drive and a memory card slot (MCD64 or MCD32) for storing and retrieving user- or third-party-created content.

The unit also has a built-in effects unit with 31 different effects such as various types of reverb and delay. Most of the effects have configurable parameters. The unit is capable of only one effect at a time, shared both by the rhythm machine and the FM synthesis unit. The ratio of the processed and unprocessed sound in the output can be configured. The processing can also be toggled off for individual channels.

References

External links
 A patch editor with support for the V50 sounds
  An editor for Atari ST or Steem emulator

V50
Music workstations
Polyphonic synthesizers
Digital synthesizers